The origins of the Sri Lankan Civil War lie in the continuous political rancor between the majority Sinhalese and the minority Sri Lankan Tamils. According to Jonathan Spencer, a social anthropologist from the School of Social and Political Studies of the University of Edinburgh, the war is an outcome of how modern ethnic identities have been made and re-made since the colonial period, with the political struggle between minority Tamils and the Sinhalese-dominant government accompanied by rhetorical wars over archeological sites and place name etymologies, and the political use of the national past.

Colonial period

The roots of the conflict can be traced back to Sri Lanka's colonial era.  Under the British colonial rule, the strategy of divide and rule was implemented to exacerbate differences between the Sinhalese majority and Tamil minority. English language schools were established in Jaffna by the American Ceylon Mission, which provided English-language skills for the Tamil population in Jaffna. The Jaffna Tamil upper castes benefited from this education system, enabling them to secure disproportionately more civil service opportunities compared to the Sinhalese.  As English education was paramount for gaining employment in the civil service, the colonial policies of the British created exclusion in the government of the Sinhala only speaking majority (as well as the non-English speaking Tamils). The British selected their candidates for the civil service on a merit basis through an open civil service exam without an ethnic quota. The Central Intelligence Agency and Sinhalese Professor of English D. C. R. A. Goonetilleke claim that there was a pattern of favouritism shown towards the Tamil population by the British This was contradicted by S. W. R. D. Bandaranaike, the fourth Prime Minister of the Dominion of Ceylon, who stated that the Tamils gained a "dominant position in the public services" due to their hard work and merit in passing the qualifying examinations. The Sinhalese masses who were not proficient in English felt discriminated and were frustrated over the educational and economic inequalities they faced under the colonial rule. Moreover, the British pushed for the dominance of Christianity and the removal of privileging Buddhism in the state government, the main religion followed by the Sinhalese. The policies that were put forward by the British to privilege the country’s English speaking population exacerbated the grievances of the non-English speaking population (the majority of which were Sinhalese) as they faced difficulties in  accessing economic opportunity and state-granted benefits.  After the British colonial rule in Sri Lanka ended, ethnic tension between the Sinhalese and the Sri Lankan Tamils rose.

Lead up to armed struggle
A primary contributor to the development of political awareness amongst Tamils during the European colonial rule was the advent of Protestant missionaries on a large scale from 1814. Missionary activities by missionaries of the American Board of Commissioners for Foreign Missions, Methodists and Anglican churches led to a revival amongst Hindu Tamils who built their own schools, temples, societies and published literature to counter the missionary activities. The success of this effort led the Tamils to think confidently of themselves as a community and prepared the way for self-consciousness as a cultural, religious and linguistic community in the mid-19th century.

Great Britain, which had come to control the whole of the island in 1815, instituted a legislative council in 1833 with three Europeans and one each for Sinhalese, Sri Lankan Tamils and Burghers. This council's primary requirement was to play an advisory role to the Governor. These positions eventually came to be elected. From the introduction of the advisory council to the Donoughmore Commission in 1931 until the Soulbury Commission in 1947, the main dispute between the Sinhalese and Tamils elites was over the question of representation and not on the structure of the government. The issue of power sharing was used by the nationalists of both communities to create an escalating inter-ethnic rivalry which has continually gained momentum ever since.

There was initially little tension amongst Sri Lanka's two largest ethnic groups, the Sinhalese and the Tamils, when Ponnambalam Arunachalam, a Tamil, was appointed representative of the Sinhalese as well the Tamils in the national legislative council. However, the British Governor William Manning actively encouraged the concept of "communal representation" and created the Colombo seat which alternated between the Tamils and the Sinhalese. Subsequently, the Donoughmore Commission strongly rejected communal representation, and brought in universal franchise. The decision was strongly opposed by the Tamil political leadership, who realized that they would be reduced to a minority in parliament, according to the proportion of the population they make up. G. G. Ponnambalam, a leader of the Tamil community, proposed to the Soulbury Commission that there should be 50–50 representation (50% for the Sinhalese, 50% for all other ethnic groups, including Tamils) in the proposed independent Ceylon – a proposal that was rejected. The Second World War served as an interregnum where the adroit politics of D. S. Senanayake successfully balancing the polarising tendencies of the Sinhalese as well as Tamil nationalists.
Following independence in 1948, G. G. Ponnambalam and the party he founded, the All Ceylon Tamil Congress (Tamil Congress), joined D. S. Senanayake's moderate, Western-oriented, United National Party Government. This Government pass the Ceylon Citizenship Act of 1948, which denied citizenship to Sri Lankans of Indian origin and resulted in Sri Lanka becoming a majoritanian state.  Sri Lanka's government represented only the majority community, the Sinhalese community, and had marginalized the minorities, causing a "severe degree of alienation" among the minority communities. When this Act was passed, the Tamil Congress was strongly criticized by the opposition Marxist groups and the newly formed Sri Lankan Tamil nationalist Federal Party (FP). S. J. V. Chelvanayakam, the leader of this new party, contested the citizenship act before the Supreme Court of Sri Lanka, and then in the Privy council in England, on grounds of discrimination towards minorities, but he did not prevail in overturning it. The FP took two seats in the 1952 election, against the Tamil Congress' four, but in the 1956 election it became the dominant party in the Tamil districts and remained so for two decades. The FP's came to be known for its uncompromising stand on Tamil rights. In response to the parliamentary act that made Sinhala the sole official language in 1956, Federal MPs staged a non violent sit in (satyagraha) protest, but it was broken up by a nationalist mob. The police and other state authorities present at the location failed to take action to stop the violence.  The FP was cast as scapegoats and were briefly banned after the 1958 riots in which many were killed and thousands of Tamils forced to flee their homes.

Another point of conflict between the communities was state sponsored colonization schemes that had the effect of changing the demographic balance in the Eastern province in favor of majority Sinhalese that the Tamil nationalists considered to be their traditional homeland. It has been perhaps the most immediate cause of inter-communal violence.

In the 1970s importing Tamil-language films, books, magazines, journals, etc. from the cultural hub of Tamil Nadu, India was banned. Sri Lanka also banned local groups affiliated with groups such as the Dravida Munnetra Kazhagam (DMK) and the Tamil Youth League. Foreign exchange for the long established practice of Tamil students going to India for university education was stopped.  Equally, examinations for external degrees from the University of London were abolished. This had the effect of culturally cutting off the links between Tamil Sri Lankans and Tamils from India. The then government insisted that these measures were part of a general program of economic self-sufficiency as part of its socialist agenda and not targeted against the Tamil minority.

The policy of standardization was a policy implemented by the Sri Lankan government in 1971 to curtail the number of Tamil students selected for certain faculties in the universities.

In 1973, the Federal Party decided to demand for a separate state. To further their nationalistic cause they merged with the other Tamil political parties to become the Tamil United Liberation Front (TULF) in 1975. On 1976, after the first National convention of the Tamil United Liberation Front, the Ceylon Tamils moved towards a morphed nationalism which meant that they were now unwilling to live within a confined single island entity. Chelvanayakam and the Federal Party had always campaigned for a unitary country and thought that partitioning of the country would be “suicidal” up until 1973. However policies by the various governments that was considered to be discriminatory by Tamil leadership modified the stand to Tamil Nationalism.

Rise of militancy

Since 1948 when Sri Lanka became independent, successive governments have adopted policies that had the effect of net preference to the majority Sinhalese at the expense of the minority Sri Lankan Tamils. The governments adopted these policies in order to assist the Sinhalese community in such areas as education and public employment. But these policies severely curtailed the middle class Tamil youth, who found it more difficult during the 1970s and 1980s to enter a university or secure employment. These individuals belonging to this younger generation, often referred to by other Tamils as "the boys" (Podiyan in Tamil language) formed many militant organizations. The most important contributor to the strength of the militant groups was the Black July  pogrom which was perceived have been an organized event in which over 1000 Sri Lankan Tamil civilians were killed  prompting many youth to prefer the armed path of resistance.

By the end of 1987, they had fought not only the Sri Lankan security forces but also the Indian Peace Keeping Force. They also fought among each other, as well, with equal if not greater brutality. The main group: Liberation Tigers of Tamil Eelam (LTTE), a rebel group, decimated most of the others. They represented intergenerational tensions as well as caste and ideological differences. Except the LTTE, many of the remaining organizations have morphed into minor political parties within the Tamil National Alliance or as standalone political parties. Some also function as paramilitary groups within the Sri Lankan military.

Denial of citizenship to Indian Tamils

There is a sizable population of Tamils in the Central Province, plantation laborers brought down from India by the British colonial authorities in the 19th and 20th centuries. These Indian Tamils (or Estate Tamils), as they are called, still work mainly in Sri Lanka's tea plantations. They have been locked in poverty for generations and continue to experience poor living conditions. Although they speak dialects of the same language, they are usually considered a separate community from the Sri Lankan Tamils of the North and East.

The government of D.S. Senanayake passed legislation stripping the estate Tamils of their citizenship in 1949, leaving them stateless.

The effect was to tilt the island's political balance away from the Tamils.  In 1948, at independence, the Tamils had 33% of the voting power in Parliament.. Upon the disenfranchisement of the estate Tamils, however, this proportion dropped to 20%. The Sinhalese could and did obtain more than a 2/3 majority in Parliament, making it impossible for Tamils to exercise an effective opposition to Sinhalese policies affecting them. The main reason for the imbalance was that several multi-member constituencies elected a Tamil member of Parliament in a majority Sinhalese electorate. The idea in having multi-member constituencies was to prevent domination of minorities by a future nationalist government.

Not content with stripping their citizenship, successive governments tried to remove the estate Tamils from the country entirely.  In 1964, Prime Minister Sirimavo Bandaranaike signed an agreement with Indian Prime Minister L.B. Shastri.  A second agreement was signed three years later with Indira Gandhi. These provided that 600,000 of the estate Tamils would be expelled and sent to India over a 15-year period, and 375,000 would be restored their Sri Lankan citizenship.  Not all of the former group actually returned to India, and remained in Sri Lanka without the ability to vote, travel abroad, or participate fully in Sri Lankan life.  It was not until 2003 that full citizenship rights were restored to the remaining Tamils in the hill country.

Language policy

The detailed reports of the Kandyan Peasantry commission (1947), the Buddhist commission (1956), as well as statistics of preponderant admissions of Tamil speaking students to the university provided a basis for these Sinhalese activists who ensured S.W.R.D. Bandaranaike won a landslide victory in 1956, campaigning on a strong Sinhalese nationalist platform.

Ethnic conflict was aggravated by the Sinhala Official Language Act of 1956.  General consensus existed that English should be replaced as the country's official language.  In the Act, the Sri Lankan government replaced English with Sinhala which deprived the Tamils of their right to deal with government institutions in their language as well as limited their opportunity to join government service. By 1956 approximately 75% of the population maintained fluency in the Sinhala language, approximately 15% were proficient in Tamil and the remaining ethnic groups spoke mainly English including the Burghers and Muslims. Multi-linguism was not common-spread, although many Sri Lankans had knowledge of at least two of the three main languages.

The Sri Lanka Freedom Party (SLFP) government led by Solomon Bandaranaike was sworn into office on a platform that of helping the growing population of unemployed youth who were disenfranchised by the Sinhala Official Language policy. A majority of civil servants under colonial rule were Tamil whose positions benefited from free English-medium missionary schools in the north and east of the island.   The Tamil Federal Party led a group of Tamil volunteers and staged a sit-down satyagraha (peaceful protest).

The Sinhala Official Language policy was gradually weakened by all subsequent governments and in 1987 Tamil was made an official language of Sri Lanka, alongside Sinhala. English has remained the de facto language of governance; government activity continues to be carried out in English, including the drafting of legislation.

1958 riots

In the 1958 riots, 150–200 people were killed, primarily Tamils and thousands more were assaulted and Tamil property looted. Over 25,000 Tamil refugees were relocated to the North. Similarly, a large number of Sinhalese were killed or expelled from the North and East of country and were relocated in the South.

1970 – Banning of Tamil media and literature importation
Importing Tamil-language films, books, magazines, journals, etc. from the cultural hub of Tamil Nadu, India was banned in 1970. This was perceived by some minority Sri Lankan Tamil politicians as directed against their cultural survival. Sri Lanka also banned groups such as the Dravida Munnetra Kazhagam and the Tamil Youth League. Culturally, Tamil Sri Lankans were cut off from Tamil Nadu. But some argue that it led to native Sri Lankan Tamil literature and media to thrive without competition from India.

Foreign exchange for the long established practice of Tamil students going to India for university education was stopped. Equally, examinations for external degrees from the University of London were abolished. The government insisted this was a part of a general program of economic self-sufficiency, part of its socialist agenda, however most of the Tamil population did not accept nor believe this.

1971 – Universities Act

During the 1970s university admissions were standardized. The policy of standardization was a policy implemented by the Sri Lankan government in 1971 to curtail the number of Tamil students selected for certain faculties in the universities.

Under the British, English was the state language and consequently greatly benefited English speakers. However, the majority of the Sri Lankan populace lived outside urban areas and did not belong to the social elite, and therefore did not enjoy the benefits of English-medium education. The issue was compounded further by the fact that in the Jaffna district, where a largely Tamil speaking populace resided, students had access to English-medium education through missionary schools. This created a situation where a large proportion of university students enrolled in professional courses such as medicine and engineering were English speaking Tamils.

Rise of separatism
At first, Tamil politicians pushed for a federal system through the Federal Party.  This was met with suspicion and resistance from many Sinhalese.  In the 1960s, the government of Sirimavo Bandaranaike proceeded to nationalize most missionary schools in the country, secularizing them and changing the language of instruction from English to Sinhala only.  After this, it became rare for Sinhalese and Tamil children to attend school together.  Unable to speak Sinhalese, it became increasingly difficult for Tamil youth to gain access to civil service jobs or attend universities, and unemployment rose.

The name of the country was changed from Ceylon to Sri Lanka in 1970, a name of Sanskrit origin that angered and alienated many Tamils.

Vaddukoddai Resolution
The concept of a separate nation, Tamil Eelam, was proposed by the Tamil United Liberation Front (TULF) in the Vaddukoddai Resolution in 1976. TULF was a coalition of parties who went on to campaign in the 1977 elections for an independent state for Tamils in Sri Lanka. They won most of the Tamil seats, but the government later banned them from Parliament for advocating an independent state.Tamil Separatists led by LTTE took over leadership of the Tamils during the course of the Sri Lankan Civil War.

1981 – Destruction of the Jaffna Public Library

A Sinhalese mob went on a rampage on the nights of May 31 to June 2 burning the market area of Jaffna, the office of the Tamil Newspaper, the home of the member of Parliament for Jaffna, the Jaffna Public Library and killing four people. The destruction of the Jaffna Public Library was the incident which appeared to cause the most distress to the people of Jaffna.  The 95,000 volumes of the Public Library destroyed by the fire included numerous culturally important and irreplaceable manuscripts.  Witnesses reported the presence of uniformed police officers in the mob and their involvement in the deaths of four individuals.

Outbreak of war

References

Sri Lankan civil war
Politics of Sri Lanka
Sri Lankan Tamil history
Tamil Eelam
Origins of the Sri Lankan Civil War